Dharam Pal Gonder (Dankal) is an Indian politician. He was elected to the Haryana Legislative Assembly from Nilokheri in the 2019 Haryana Legislative Assembly election as a member and Independent candidate.

References 

1980 births
Living people
Bharatiya Janata Party politicians from Haryana
People from Karnal district
Haryana MLAs 2019–2024